The 1940 Southwark Central by-election was held on 10 February 1940. The by-election was held due to the death of the incumbent Labour MP, Harry Day. It was won by the Labour candidate John Hanbury Martin.

References

Southwark Central by-election
Southwark Central by-election
Southwark Central by-election
Southwark Central,1940
Southwark Central,1940